Helena Sturtevant (1872-1946) was an American painter.

Biography
Sturtevant was born in Middletown, Rhode Island on  October 13, 1863. She attended the School of the Museum of Fine Arts, Boston and the Académie Colarossi. Her teachers included Edmund C. Tarbell, Lucien Simon, and Jacques-Émile Blanche. She exhibited her work at the Art Institute of Chicago, and the Paris Salon. She was a member of the American Artists Professional League, the American Federation of Arts, the College Art Association, the International Society of Arts and Letters, the National Association of Women Painters and Sculptors, and the Newport Art Association.

Sturtevant died in Newport, Rhode Island in 1946.

References

External links
 

1872 births
1946 deaths
19th-century American women artists
20th-century American women artists
People from Middletown, Rhode Island
Artists from Rhode Island
School of the Museum of Fine Arts at Tufts alumni
Académie Colarossi alumni